Clifford Terry Kresge (born October 3, 1968) is an American professional golfer. He has played on the PGA Tour and Web.com Tour since 1997.

Kresge was born in Lakewood Township, New Jersey. His parents moved to central Florida in 1972 and lived on the Dubsdread Golf Course in Orlando where he took golf at age 8. He graduated from the University of Central Florida with a liberal arts degree in 1991 and turned professional. He played mainly on mini-tours until 1997 when he joined the Nationwide Tour.

Kresge has three wins on the Nationwide Tour. His best finishes on the PGA Tour are a pair of T-3 at the 2002 B.C. Open and the 2008 Arnold Palmer Invitational (an event he grew up attending after his family moved to Orlando, Florida). He also finished tied for 10th in the 2003 U.S. Open.

Kresge won a 2011 NGA Hooters Tour event; the Bridgestone Winter Series at Deer Island GC in a four-hole playoff. 

Kresge currently resides with his wife Judy in Kingsport, Tennessee. Judy has three sons from previous marriage while Cliff has a son of his own also from a previous marriage. Judy's oldest son Peter often caddies for Kresge.

Kresge has gone public, along with Ernie Els, about both of their sons being diagnosed with autism. Kresge was the Honorary Walk Chair for the November 15, 2008 Orlando Walk Now For Autism, a fundraiser for Autism Speaks. In September 2009, Kresge along with Els and 18 other PGA Tour players held a charity Pro-Am at Ridgefields Country Club in Kingsport for his Autism Charity: Kresge's Krew Foundation. The foundation again held their annual tournament at Ridgefields in 2010 and 2011. Ernie Els returned to headline a field of 15 PGA Tour players

Professional wins (4)

Nationwide Tour wins (3)

Nationwide Tour playoff record (3–0)

Other wins (1)
2011 Bridgestone Winter Series at Deer Island GC (NGA Hooters Tour)

Results in major championships

CUT = missed the half way cut
"T" indicates a tie for a place.

See also
2000 PGA Tour Qualifying School graduates
2002 Buy.com Tour graduates

References

External links

American male golfers
UCF Knights men's golfers
PGA Tour golfers
Korn Ferry Tour graduates
Golfers from New Jersey
Golfers from Florida
Golfers from Tennessee
Sportspeople from Lakewood Township, New Jersey
People from Seminole County, Florida
People from Kingsport, Tennessee
1968 births
Living people